The Women's Downhill in the 2021 FIS Alpine Skiing World Cup consisted of seven events. The original schedule had called for eight downhills, but (as discussed below) the World Cup finals race was canceled. 

2018 discipline champion Sofia Goggia of Italy, who had struggled with injuries since then, held the lead through midseason, and after the second downhill at Crans Montana, she had opened up a 195-point lead over Breezy Johnson of the United States, with everyone else over 200 points behind. However, he then broke a bone in her knee on 31 January and missed the next two events, providing two Swiss skiers (defending discipline champion Corinne Suter of Switzerland and 2016 overall champion Lara Gut-Behrami) with the opportunity to pass her at the season final with a great finish.

The season was interrupted by the 2021 World Ski Championships, which were held from 8–21 February in Cortina d'Ampezzo, Italy.  The women's downhill took place on 13 February 2021.

The final was scheduled for Wednesday, 17 March in Lenzerheide, Switzerland. Tentatively, Goggia had planned to try to return for the finals, although her broken bone was still mending. However, three straight days of heavy snowfall, which prevented even a training run from being held, caused the downhill finals to be cancelled, and so Goggia won her second downhill crystal globe without needing to return (her first was in 2018).

Standings

DNF = Did Not Finish
DNS = Did Not Start

See also
 2021 Alpine Skiing World Cup – Women's summary rankings
 2021 Alpine Skiing World Cup – Women's Overall
 2021 Alpine Skiing World Cup – Women's Super-G
 2021 Alpine Skiing World Cup – Women's Giant Slalom
 2021 Alpine Skiing World Cup – Women's Slalom
 2021 Alpine Skiing World Cup – Women's Parallel
 World Cup scoring system

References

External links
 

Women's Downhill
FIS Alpine Ski World Cup women's downhill discipline titles